BL2 could refer to:

 BL2, a postcode district in the BL postcode area
 Biosafety Level 2
 The EMD BL2 locomotive
 Borderlands 2, a space Western role-playing game